A Song of Ice and Fire is a series of fantasy novels by George R. R. Martin. The novels were later adapted for the HBO television series Game of Thrones in 2011.

Video games
As of 2021, eleven video games based on the A Song of Ice and Fire novels and Game of Thrones series have been released. The following table showcases the correspondent title, release date, publisher, developer and the platforms on which each game was released along with any other relevant information.

{|class="wikitable plainrowheaders" style="text-align: center;"
|+ List of A Song of Ice and Fire video games
! scope="col" rowspan="2" style="width: 22em;" | Title
! scope="col" rowspan="2" style="width: 28em;" | Release details
! scope="col" colspan="4" | Platform(s)
|-
! scope="col" style="width: 6em;" | PC
! scope="col" style="width: 6em;" | Console
! scope="col" style="width: 6em;" | Mobile
! scope="col" style="width: 6em;" | Other
|-

! scope="row" | Blood of Dragons
|
 Released: 2007
 Publishers: Westeros.org
 Developer: Westeros.org

|style="background:#fdd;"|
|style="background:#fdd;"|
|style="background:#fdd;"|
|style="background:#dfd;"| Web browser
|-

! scope="row" | A Game of Thrones: Genesis
|
 Released: 2011
 Publisher: Focus Home Interactive
 Developer: Amusement Cyanide

|style="background:#dfd;"| Microsoft Windows
|style="background:#fdd;"|
|style="background:#fdd;"|
|style="background:#fdd;"|
|-

! scope="row" | Game of Thrones
|
 Released: 2012
 Publishers: Atlus USA, Focus Home Interactive
 Developer: Cyanide

|style="background:#dfd;"| Microsoft Windows 
|style="background:#dfd;"| Xbox 360  PS3
|style="background:#fdd;"|
|style="background:#fdd;"|
|-

! scope="row" | Game of Thrones Ascent
|
 Released: 2013-2019
 Publishers: Disruptor Beam
 Developer: Disruptor Beam

|style="background:#fdd;"|
|style="background:#fdd;"|
|style="background:#dfd;"| iOS  Android
|style="background:#dfd;"| Facebook  Web browser
|-

! scope="row" | Game of Thrones
|
 Released: 2014–2015
 Publishers: Telltale Games
 Developer: Telltale Games

|style="background:#dfd;"| Microsoft Windows  macOS
|style="background:#dfd;"| Xbox 360  Xbox One  PS3  PS4
|style="background:#dfd;"| iOS  Android
|style="background:#fdd;"| 
|-

! scope="row" | Game of Thrones: Conquest
|
 Released: October 19, 2017
 Publishers: Warner Bros. Interactive Entertainment
 Developer: Turbine

|style="background:#fdd;"|
|style="background:#fdd;"| 
|style="background:#dfd;"| iOS  Android
|style="background:#fdd;"|
|-

! scope="row" | Reigns: Game of Thrones'
|
 Released: October 18, 2018
 Publishers: Devolver Digital
 Developer: Nerial

|style="background:#dfd;"| Microsoft Windows  Linux  macOS
|style="background:#dfd;"| Nintendo Switch
|style="background:#dfd;"| iOS  Android
|style="background:#fdd;"| 
|-

! scope="row" | Game of Thrones: Winter is Coming|
 Released: March 26, 2019 
 Publishers: Yoozoo Games
 Developer: Yoozoo Games

|style="background:#dfd;"| Microsoft Windows
|style="background:#fdd;"| 
|style="background:#dfd;"| iOS  Android
|style="background:#dfd;"| Web browser
|-

! scope="row" | Game of Thrones Slots|
 Released: May 30, 2019
 Publishers: Zynga
 Developer: Zynga

|style="background:#fdd;"|
|style="background:#fdd;"|
|style="background:#dfd;"| iOS  Android 
|style="background:#dfd;"| Facebook  Web browser  Amazon Kindle
|-

! scope="row" | Game of Thrones: Beyond the Wall|
 Released: March 26, 2020 (iOS), April 3, 2020 (Android)
 Publishers: Behaviour Interactive
 Developer: GAEA

|style="background:#fdd;"|
|style="background:#fdd;"|
|style="background:#dfd;"| iOS  Android
|style="background:#fdd;"| 
|-

! scope="row" | Game of Thrones: Tale of Crows|
 Released: August 7, 2020
 Publishers: Devolver Digital
 Developer: That Silly Studio

|style="background:#dfd;"| macOS
|style="background:#fdd;"|
|style="background:#dfd;"| iOS
|style="background:#dfd;"| tvOS
|-

!scope="row" | A Game of Thrones: The Board Game|
 Released: October 6, 2020 (PC), April 8, 2021 (Mobile)
 Publishers: Asmodee Digital
 Developer: Dire Wolf Digital

|style="background:#dfd;"| Microsoft Windows  macOS
|style="background:#fdd;"|
|style="background:#dfd;"| iOS  Android 
|style="background:#fdd;"| 
|-

! scope="row" | Game of Thrones|
 Released: 2023 (TBD)
 Publishers: Netmarble
 Developer: Netmarble Neo

|style="background:#fdd;"|
|style="background:#fdd;"|
|style="background:#dfd;"| iOS  Android
|style="background:#fdd;"| 
|-
|}

See also
 Elden Ring''
 List of video game franchises

References

 
Video game franchises
Lists of video games by franchise